French Creek Township may refer to the following townships in the United States:

 French Creek Township, Allamakee County, Iowa
 French Creek Township, Mercer County, Pennsylvania
 French Creek Township, Venango County, Pennsylvania